Sa'id ibn Jubayr (665–714), also known as Abū Muhammad, was originally from Kufa, in modern-day Iraq. He was regarded as one of the leading members of the Tabi'in (d. ca. 712). Sa'īd is held in the highest esteem by scholars of the Shi'a and Sunni Islamic tradition and was considered one of the leading jurists of the time. He also narrated several hadith from Ibn Abbas.

Life
At the battle of Jamājim in 82 AH (699-701), Ibn al-Ash'ath and his followers, including 100,000 from amongst the mawāli, took on the army of al-Hajjāj (d. 714), the governor of the Iraqi provinces during the reign of the Umayyad caliph Abd al-Malik. Within their forces was a group known as the 'Battalion of Qur'an Reciters' headed by Kumayl ibn Ziyad an-Nakha`i and including Sa`īd ibn Jubayr. The revolt was brutally put down and Sa`īd was forced to flee to the outskirts of Mecca. He persisted in travelling to Mecca itself twice a year to perform the hajj and `umrah and would enter Kufa secretly to help resolve peoples' religious issues.

Dialogue between Ibn Jubayr and al-Hajjaj
Sa'īd was finally apprehended and brought before al-Hajjāj. Excerpts from a transcript of their dialogue follows:Sa'īd ibn Jubayr entered upon al-Hajjāj, who asked his name (and he knew his name well):

Sa'īd: Sa'īd ibn Jubayr.

Al-Hajjaj: Nay, you are Shaqīy ibn Kusayr. (al-Hajjāj is playing with words here: Sa'īd means happy and Shaqī means unhappy; Jubayr means one who splints broken bones and Kusayr means one who breaks them.)

Sa'īd: My mother knew better when she named me.

Al-Hajjāj: You are wretched (shaqīta) and your mother is wretched" (shaqiyat). Then he told him: "By Allah, I will replace your dunya with a blazing Fire.

Sa'īd: If I knew you could do it, I would take you as a God.

Al-Hajjāj: I have gold and wealth.

Bags of gold and silver were brought and spread before Sa'īd ibn Jubayr in order to try him.
 
Sa'īd: O Hajjāj, if you gathered it to be seen and heard in showing off, and to use it to avert others from the way of Allah, then by Allah, it will not avail you against Him in any way. Saying this, he aligned himself towards Qiblah.

Al-Hajjāj: Take him and turn him to other than the Qiblah. By Allah, O Sa'īd ibn Jubayr, I will kill you with a killing with which I have not killed any of the people.

Sa'īd: O Hajjāj choose for yourself whatever killing you want, by Allah you will not kill me with a killing except that Allah will kill you with a like of it, so choose for yourself whatever killing you like.

Al-Hajjāj: Turn him to other than the Qiblah.

Sa'īd: Wherever you [might] turn, there is the Face of Allah.

Al-Hajjāj: Put him under the earth.

Sa'īd: From it (the earth) We created you, and into it We will return you, and from it We will extract you another time.

Al-Hajjāj was outdone and ordered the beheading of Sa'īd ibn Jubayr. Sa'īd was martyred in the month of Sha'bān, 95 AH (ca. May 714) at the age of 49. Al-Hajjāj is reported to have soon lost his senses and died within a month.

Legacy

Sunni view
 writes:

From him are recorded by Imams Bukhari, Muslim, al-Tirmidhi, al-Nasa'i, Abu Dawud, Ibn Maja, Imam Ahmad ibn Hanbal, and Imam Malik ibn Anas. Sa'id narrates 147 traditions in Sahih Bukhari and 78 in Sahih Muslim.

Shia view
According to Khulasat al-aqwal by Al-Hilli and  Rijal al-Kashshi by Muhammad ibn 'Umar al-Kashshi he was a Shia Muslim. They point out, among many, that Sa'id ibn Jubayr was a follower and companion of Ali ibn Husayn Zayn al-Abidin, supported the Alid rebellion against the Umayyads, for which he was killed by the Umayyad appointed Al-Hajjaj ibn Yusuf.

Sa'id was asked by Abd al-Malik ibn Marwan to write a book concerning Quranic exegesis. His exegesis is mentioned by Ibn al-Nadim in his al-Fihrist under Shiite exegeses, without mentioning any other exegesis that is temporally prior to it.

His mausoleum is located in al-Hay city in the Wasit Province of Iraq. In Iraq, Rabi' al-Awwal 25 of every year is recognized as the anniversary of Sa'id ibn Jubayr's martyrdom. On this day people congregate in his mausoleum and honor the day. His mausoleum is a pilgrimage site for the Shia Muslims.

See also
Ibn Abbas
Kumayl ibn Ziyad

Notes

Bibliography
 al-Mufīd, Kitāb al-Irshād, Ansariyan Publications.
 al-Qarashi, B.S., The Life of Imam Zayn l-'Abidin, Ansariyan Publications, 2000.
 al-Sayyid, K., Saeed bin Jubayr, Ansariyan Publications, 1996.
 Jafri,S.H.M., The Origins and Early Development of Shi'a Islam, Oxford University Press, 2001.
 Madelung, W., The Succession to Muhammad (A study of the early Caliphate), Cambridge University Press, 1997.
 Weststeijn. J.K. & de Voogt, A.J., "Dreams in Tabari: Husayn, Jubayr, and those in God's favor in the Umayyad period", Le Muséon: Revue d'études orientales 120:225–29, 2007.
 Weststeijn, Johan, & Alex de Voogt, "Sa'id b. Gubayr: piety, chess and rebellion", Arabica,  49/3 (2002): 383–6.

665 births
714 deaths
Iraqi imams
7th-century Arabs
Tabi‘un hadith narrators